Nuclear power in Taiwan accounts for 2,945 MWe of capacity by means of 1 active plants and 2 reactors. In 2015, before the closure of 3 reactors, they made up around 8.1% of its national primary energy consumption, and 19% of its electricity generation. The technology chosen for the reactors has been General Electric BWR technology for 2 plants and Westinghouse PWR technology for the Maanshan Nuclear Power Plant. Construction of the Lungmen Nuclear Power Plant using the ABWR design has encountered public opposition and a host of delays, and in April 2014 the government decided to suspend construction.

Active seismic faults run across the island, and anti-nuclear environmentalists argue Taiwan is unsuited for nuclear plants. A 2011 report by the environmental advocacy group, the Natural Resources Defense Council, evaluated the seismic hazard to reactors worldwide, as determined by the Global Seismic Hazard Assessment Program data, placed all of Taiwan's reactors within the highest risk group of 12 reactors within very high seismic hazard areas, along with some of Japan's reactors.

The 2016 election was won by a government with stated policies that included phasing out nuclear power generation. A referendum in 2018 voted to retain nuclear power, however in January 2019 the government stated that there would be no life-extensions for existing plants or restarts to building nuclear power plants. Another referendum in late 2021, proposing to restart the construction of the Lungmen Nuclear Power Plant, was rejected. The result is aligned with the current policy of the government.

Organization

All plants are run by Taipower. The Atomic Energy Council (AEC) of the Republic of China is effectively the regulatory body, but plants are also subject to International Atomic Energy Agency safeguards.

History

Taiwanese plants' performance has improved considerably. Their availability rose from 70% in the 1970s to 90% in the 1990s. Safety indices also improved as the number of scrams decreased (30 a year in 1984 to 2 or 3 a year now) and radioactive emissions decreased.

Funds are collected as part of nuclear electricity sales to pay for management of the spent fuel and decommissioning. This NT$196 billion plus (in 2009) fund is expected to cover all future liabilities.

Nuclear power has declined in Taiwan from 14% in 1990 to 7.3% in 2005, having been partly replaced by coal that rose from 23% to 32% in the same period.
Per capita carbon dioxide emissions are three times the world average and Taiwan ranked number one in annual increase of per capita carbon dioxide emissions in 2008.

Taiwanese plants are high performers, with above average 88.5% availability over 2005–2010.

By 2012, nuclear power provided 16% of electricity generation, with coal at 47% and natural gas at 16%.

Post-Fukushima
Following the Fukushima I nuclear accidents in Japan, nuclear energy has emerged as a contentious issue. In March 2011, around 2,000 anti-nuclear protesters demonstrated in Taiwan for an immediate halt to the construction of the island's fourth nuclear power plant. The protesters were also opposed to plans to extend the lifespan of three existing nuclear plants.

On the eve of World Environment Day in June 2011, environmental groups demonstrated against Taiwan's nuclear power policy. The Taiwan Environmental Protection Union, together with 13 environmental groups and legislators, gathered in Taipei with banners that read: "I love Taiwan, not nuclear disasters". They protested against the nation's three operating nuclear power plants and the construction of a fourth plant. They also called for "all nuclear power plants to be thoroughly re-evaluated and shut down immediately if they fail to pass safety inspections".

According to Wang To-far, economics professor at National Taipei University, "if a level-seven nuclear crisis were to happen in Taiwan, it would destroy the nation". George Hsu, a professor of applied economics at National Chung Hsing University in central Taiwan, said nuclear power plants in quake-prone areas need to be redesigned to make them more resistant, an investment that would reduce their original cost advantage.

The retirement of existing nuclear reactors was a significant issue in the 2012 presidential election. The 2016 election was won by the Pan-Green Coalition with policies that included a move toward a nuclear-free society, and is considering legislating to phase out nuclear power generation within nine years. A referendum in 2018 voted to retain nuclear power in Taiwan, however in January 2019 the government stated that there would be no life-extensions for existing plants or restarts to building nuclear power plants.

Lungmen Nuclear Power Plant

In 2011, many experts, scientists, and NGOs found 40 errors in its construction.

Since 2011, many more Taiwanese began to support halting the plant construction, although the state-owned Taiwan Power Company said it will make electricity price increase by 40%. Some activists speculate that Taiwan Power Co. has seriously underestimated the price tag of nuclear power.

In April 2014, the Taiwanese government decided to halt the remaining construction of the Lungmen power plant. The first reactor will be sealed after the completion of safety checks, and construction of the second reactor will be halted. A final decision may be subject to a national referendum. , no plan has been advanced for lay-up of the plant.

List of nuclear power stations in Taiwan

Future energy options
Former president Lee Teng-hui in 2013 stated that Taiwan could not afford to abandon nuclear power in the near future and should enhance its nuclear energy program by developing advanced nuclear technologies, such as nuclear fusion. 
Lee Teng-hui also stated that wind and solar sources of energy both have limitations and could not fill the void left by nuclear power.

In 2013, Don Shapiro, Senior Director of the American Chamber of Commerce in Taipei, noted that risks regarding nuclear safety and security will need to be weighed against the risk of serious power shortages and substantially higher electricity costs if Taiwan abandons the nuclear option. He further observed that nuclear power currently accounts for about 17 percent of the electricity generated in Taiwan, and President Ma Ying-jeou has already stated that the existing three nuclear plants will be decommissioned when their authorized 40-year lifespans expire between 2018 and 2025. Without a new nuclear plant or extension of the old ones, Shapiro questioned whether Taiwan has feasible options for meeting its energy needs, since in Shapiro's opinion, renewable sources such as solar and wind energy are not sufficient to take up that slack, coal-fired plants face opposition on environmental grounds, and heavy reliance on liquefied natural gas – which is highly expensive to transport and store – could be so expensive as to undermine Taiwan industry's competitiveness.

President Tsai Ing-wen said in January 2015 that her party aimed to phase out nuclear power in Taiwan by 2025.

Research centers 
Currently there are four nuclear research centers in Taiwan ranging up to 2.8 MW.

According to Dr. Cheng Chio-Zong, Taiwan has to step up its pace in fusion power research if it wishes to develop more sources of clean energy.

Nuclear waste disposal

The Lanyu nuclear waste storage facility was built on Lanyu Island in 1982. The storage plant is at the southern tip of the 45-square-kilometer island, which is located off the southeastern coast of Taiwan proper. The plant receives nuclear waste from Taiwan's three nuclear power plants operated by state utility Taipower. Islanders did not have a say in the decision to locate the facility on the island.

In 2002, almost 2,000 protesters, including many Aboriginal residents of Taiwan's Orchid Island staged a sit-in in front of the storage plant, calling on Taipower to remove nuclear waste from the island. They were also protesting against the government's failure to keep its pledge to withdraw 100,000 barrels of low-level nuclear waste from their isle by the end of 2002. In a bid to allay safety concerns, Taipower has pledged to repackage the waste since many of the iron barrels used for storage have become rusty from the island's salty and humid air. Taipower has for years been exploring ways to ship the nuclear waste overseas for final storage, but plans to store the waste in an abandoned North Korean coal mine have met with strong protests from neighboring South Korea and Japan due to safety and environmental concerns, while storage in Russia or Mainland China is complicated by political factors. Taipower is "trying to convince the islanders to extend the storage arrangement for another nine years in exchange for payment of NT$200 million (about $5.7 million)".

About 100,000 barrels of nuclear waste from the nation's three operational nuclear power plants have been stored at the Lanyu complex. A report released in November 2011 said a radioactive leak had been detected outside the facility and this has added to residents’ concerns. In February 2012, hundreds of Tao Aborigines living on Lanyu held a protest outside the Lanyu nuclear waste storage facility, calling on Taiwan Power Co. to remove nuclear waste from the island as soon as possible.

In late 2019, not long before being re-elected, Tsai Ing-Wen offered a financial compensation to the Tao community. Community elders have seen this as an attempt to buy them off and have therefore rejected the offer and staged protests in front of the Executive Yuan, asking for removal of the waste.

When Taiwan ordered French uranium in the 1980s it was under the condition that the French would take back the nuclear waste for reprocessing at the La Hague site however France did not honor its obligations when it came time to reprocessing the material. As of 2021 the material scheduled for reprocessing in France still sits in temporary containment ponds in Taiwan.

Anti-nuclear movement

2010
On August 29, 2010, anti-nuclear protesters formed a human chain blocking the main entrance to the fourth nuclear power plant. Employees were forced to use alternate access routes.

2011
In March 2011, around 2,000 anti-nuclear protesters demonstrated in Taiwan for an immediate end to the construction of the island's fourth nuclear power plant. The protesters were also opposed to lifespan extensions for three existing nuclear plants.

In April 2011, 5,000 people joined an anti-nuclear protest in Taipei City, which had a carnival-like atmosphere, with protesters holding yellow banners and waving sunflowers.  This was part of a nationwide “No Nuke Action” protest, against construction of a Fourth Nuclear Plant and in favour of a more renewable energy policy.

On World Environment Day in June 2011, environmental groups demonstrated against Taiwan's nuclear power policy. The Taiwan Environmental Protection Union, together with 13 environmental groups and legislators, gathered in Taipei and protested against the nation's three operating nuclear power plants and the construction of a fourth plant.

2012
In March 2012, about 2,000 people staged an anti-nuclear protest in Taiwan's capital following the massive earthquake and tsunami that hit Japan one year earlier. The protesters rallied in Taipei to renew calls for a nuclear-free island by taking lessons from Japan's disaster on March 11, 2011. They "want the government to scrap a plan to operate a newly constructed nuclear power plant – the fourth in densely populated Taiwan". Scores of aboriginal protesters "demanded the removal of 100,000 barrels of nuclear waste stored on their Orchid Island, off south-eastern Taiwan. Authorities have failed to find a substitute storage site amid increased awareness of nuclear danger over the past decade".

2013
In March 2013, 68,000 Taiwanese protested across major cities against the island's fourth nuclear power plant, which is under construction. Taiwan's three existing nuclear plants are near the ocean, and prone to earthquakes caused by geological fractures under the island.

On 19 May 2013, 10,000 Taiwanese protested in Taipei against the further development of nuclear power in Taiwan. The protest was launched by an environmental protection organization to protest the construction of the fourth nuclear power plant. Protesters held banners and flags with writings such as No Nuclear Power or We Don't Want Another Fukushima.

On 26 May 2013, hundreds of Taiwanese protested in Taipei calling to vote down the nuclear power referendum bill and to stop the construction of Taiwan's fourth nuclear power plant. Protesters form a big yellow words displaying STOP in front of Legislative Yuan. The protest came a few days before the plan by Kuomintang to push through a bill to hold a referendum in Taiwan and decide the fate of the fourth nuclear power plant.

On 2 August 2013, nearly 100 activists from Taiwan Anti-Nuclear Action League protested against the fourth nuclear power plant in front of Legislative Yuan. They urged the government to immediately stop the project.

On 16 August 2013, Taiwanese held a press conference in Taipei to demand Taipower to stop further electricity price hike, stop construction of the fourth nuclear power plant and stop lying to the public.

On 24 August 2013, over 1,000 Taiwanese gathered at Chiang Kai-shek Memorial Hall to demand the government to stop constructing the fourth nuclear power plant. The event was organized by Moms Love Taiwan. The organization made three request during the demonstration, which were for the government to come up with energy policies, promote education on environmental and energy matters and publish the timetable for a nuclear-free Taiwan.

2014

In March 2014, around 130,000 Taiwanese marched for an anti-nuclear protest around Taiwan. They demanded that the government remove nuclear power plants in Taiwan. The march came ahead of the 3rd anniversary of Fukushima disaster. Around 50,000 people marched in Taipei while another three separate events were held around other Taiwanese cities attended by around 30,000 people. Among the participants are the organizations from Green Citizen Action's Alliance, Homemakers United Foundation, Taiwan Association for Human Rights and Taiwan Environmental Protection Union.

On April 22, 2014, Lin Yi-hsiung began an 8-day hunger strike at Taipei's Gikong Presbyterian Church to demand that the government halt the construction of the Fourth Nuclear Power Plant in New Taipei City's Gongliao District, while also calling for an amendment to the referendum law. On April 27, thousands of activists occupied Zhongxiao West Road, a major thoroughfare in front of Taipei Main Station. Riot police armed with water cannons evicted the protesters by 7 a.m. local time on April 28. Over the weekend, as many as 50,000 activists gathered on Ketagalan Blvd in front of the Presidential Office.

2018 
On March 11, 2018, protesters took to the streets to oppose Taipower's state-backed re-launch one of the reactors at Kuosheng Nuclear Plant, having been re-galvanized among others, by the magnitude 7.3 earthquake having hit the area only a few weeks earlier. Kuosheng went online nevertheless and produces  yearly electric output since.

See also 

 Atomic Energy Council
 Taiwan Power Company
 List of power stations in Taiwan
 Energy in Taiwan
 Nuclear power debate
 Low-Level Radioactive Waste Storage Site
 Nuclear energy policy
 Renewable energy in Taiwan
 Ministry of Science and Technology (Taiwan)

References

Bibliography 
 Uranium Information Center: Nuclear energy in Taiwan

 
Politics of Taiwan